T. O. Morrow is a supervillain appearing in American comic books published by DC Comics. He is responsible for the creation of the Red Tornado, Red Inferno, Red Torpedo, Red Volcano, and Tomorrow Woman androids, the last of these with the help of Professor Ivo.

T. O. Morrow appeared in the first season of the live-action Arrowverse show Supergirl, portrayed by Iddo Goldberg.

Publication history
The original T. O. Morrow (Thomas Oscar Morrow) debuted in "Trail of the False Green Lanterns", The Flash #143 (March 1964), and was created by writer Gardner Fox and artist Carmine Infantino.

The modern T. O. Morrow (Tomek Ovadya Morah) first appeared in The Flash (vol. 2) #19 (December 1988) in a story by writer William Messner-Loebs and artist Jim Mooney. Both versions are usually referred to as "T. O. Morrow" as a play on the word "tomorrow". It is generally accepted that both characters are the same man and that the name alteration came about when Tomek Ovadya Morah Americanized his name to Thomas Oscar Morrow.

Fictional character biography

Pre-Crisis
A Golden Age T. O. Morrow appeared once in Adventure Comics #86, equipped with futuristic devices attempting to scam rare elements from scientists, pretending he's an explorer from the future. He was defeated by the Shining Knight.

Using his technological prowess and his immense inventing abilities, T. O. Morrow (full name: Thomas Oscar Morrow) created a special "television set" that would allow him to see into the future. He would only be able to see 100 years or so into the future when using it, however. He would examine many of the futuristic instruments and then replicate them for use in his present time. Morrow spent a lot of time trying to perfect a time machine that he could use, but he was unsuccessful. The majority of his inventions were used to commit various types of crimes. T. O. Morrow utilized one of the inventions that he stole from the future that would allow him to create duplicates of other people. He used this invention to successfully create duplicates of Green Lantern. T. O. Morrow did this because he was bored with how easy it was to commit crimes and he wanted to do something that would give both the Flash and Green Lantern a challenge. The three duplicate Green Lanterns each went off to different parts of the world to steal different items at the same time. They were easily stopped by the Flash's super-speed. T. O. Morrow apparently died after he fell into a large machine, but in fact, he did not die and he was sent to Earth-Two.

Shortly after being defeated by the Flash and Green Lantern, T. O. Morrow created the Red Tornado. He created the Red Tornado to infiltrate the Justice Society of America so that Morrow would be able to rob the 20th Century Museum. His television screen of the future showed that he would be defeated by the JSA unless he could infiltrate the group and cause them to be unable to defend the museum. The Red Tornado was inadvertently successful in stopping the JSA. Morrow returned to Earth-One and attacked the JLA. He was able to defeat them by using his inventions and he then placed them all in stasis. The Red Tornado was upset about Morrow's deception that caused him to defeat the JSA and followed him to Earth-One. The Red Tornado freed the members of the JLA and captured Morrow. Morrow later escaped, and he manipulated the Red Tornado several more times to try and destroy the JLA. The JLA was able to easily overcome Morrow and defeat him every time.

After one particular defeat by the JLA, T. O. Morrow was drawn into another reality and split into two different people. One of the T. O. Morrows conquered an alien world and fought the Flash, the Atom, and Supergirl. The "other" T. O. Morrow was taken into the nexus of time and mutated into a higher being. He was now referring to himself as Tomorrow the Future Man. In his evolved state, his organs could not keep up with him and were failing. Morrow then transplanted his mind into the body of the Red Tornado and assumed his identity. The Red Tornado was able to fight back and he won his body back. The Future Man's body failed and he died.

Crisis on Infinite Earths

During DC's 12-issue limited series Crisis on Infinite Earths (April 1985–March 1986), T. O. Morrow was called upon by the heroes to repair the Red Tornado to help with the crisis. Morrow attempted to fix Red Tornado, but his physiology (having been altered by the Anti-Monitor) had changed too greatly for Morrow to repair. Red Tornado's body exploded as a result of the tampering of Morrow, Cyborg, and the Atom. During the explosion, T. O. Morrow escaped and fled to where the other villains were gathering and preparing to attack the heroes.

Post-Crisis
The modern T. O. Morrow's real name is Tomek Ovadya Morah, and he was born in Nasielsk, Poland. This version's first appearance was in The Flash (vol. 2) #19. He was seen at a dinner honoring the Flash's Rogues Gallery. Sometime after this, T. O. Morrow was placed in an institution in Central City. He admitted that with his time traveling and usage of all of his future inventions that he had begun to "crack up". Morrow contacted Max Lord to inform him of the impending end of the world, but Max refused to listen to him. The next time that Morrow was seen, was when he attempted to go to Dr. Hannibal Martin's office to deliver him a book that he had written full of important future dates, including the date that Morrow would die. However, Dr. Martin also blew him off and considered him to simply be delusional. Morrow would affect Max Lord's League again. In JLA Incarnations #6, he is contacted by the dictator of Bialya and supplies technology that neutralizes Booster Gold's battle-suit.

T. O. Morrow was not seen again for some time until the JLA re-formed. Morrow (apparently over his confused and delusional ways) teamed up with Professor Ivo to create the Tomorrow Woman. She was placed with the JLA during their recruitment drive in order to infiltrate and destroy the team, but like Morrow's last creation, Red Tornado, she would not follow her programming and fought with the JLA. T. O. Morrow and Professor Ivo were both captured and sent to Belle Reve prison. Ivo and he bickered over who had done better work on her, whether Ivo on her body or Morrow on her mind; Morrow won by demonstrating she had shaken off her programming, which instructed her to kill the JLA, and as did the Red Tornado, had discovered emotions and was developing as a real human being. While in prison, Morrow grew weary of Professor Ivo's boasting about his creation, Amazo. To spite Ivo, Morrow contacted the JLA and gave them information about Amazo's plan to break the mad scientists out of Belle Reve, but he gave them misinformation ("I'm sorry, but the prospect of helping the JLA makes me quite seasick[...]") and Amazo attacked the JLA.

Morrow was able to escape Belle Reve and he greatly tampered with the timeline. He returned to the time of the Justice Society of America and made many technological advancements that would allow his idea of a perfect future to exist. The JLA from the year 2000 went back to the JSA in 1941 to try and stop Morrow, but they were too late. Morrow had already made several changes to the timestream that would set up his idea of a perfect world. When everything didn't go according to plan, he went back to his past and attempted to kill his own mother. He believed that if he were raised as an orphan that he would have been stronger. Jay Garrick was able to intervene and show Morrow what he was about to do. Morrow changed his mind and allowed the JLA to capture him. He was returned to prison and has remained there since (these events were depicted in the limited series DC Comics Two Thousand).

52

During DC Comics' 52 maxi-series event, T. O. Morrow was incarcerated in Haven. In fact, he was not allowed to use any computer at all for fear that he would incite "Machine War I". Fellow inventor (and after the reboot his best student in college years) Dr. Will Magnus (creator of the Metal Men) would visit with T. O. Morrow monthly to discuss an assortment of things. Morrow in such meetings revealed that he had created a brother for Red Tornado called the Red Inferno, and hinted that someone was kidnapping "mad scientists" such as Dr. Sivana, Ira Quimby (I.Q.), Dr. Tyme, Dr. Death, and Dr. Cyclops, warning Magnus to be cautious.
Ultimately, he was able to escape from Haven, but not before leaving a last gift to his best student: the machine code necessary to restore the Metal Men.

Magnus was ultimately captured by the conspiracy Morrow had mentioned and brought to Oolong Island. He was greeted by Morrow, surrounded by beautiful girls and working freely with the other kidnapped scientists. Morrow informs Magnus that he has been drafted into their efforts creating weapons for Intergang, and subsequently arranges to have his antidepressants confiscated in order to promote his former student's more manic levels of creativity. After being targeted by Black Adam for his involvement in the creation of the Four Horsemen of Apokolips, along with his fellow scientists on Oolong Island, he helps them in subduing their angered foe, then buys back the remnants of the demolished Red Tornado from an internet auction site, hoping to extract his knowledge of the still unknown events that happened in space.

In 52 #49, the JSA attack the Oolong facility, and Will Magnus gives Morrow the teleporter to one of Sivana's robots allowing him to escape. Later in 52 #50, Morrow manages to see what Red Tornado saw, but is drafted by Booster Gold and Rip Hunter immediately after, to help them by luring Skeets to his lab, where the little robot is revealed to be controlled from the inside by Mr. Mind. After being surprised by Booster and Hunter, Mind dives outside reality, leaving Morrow and his lab behind.

After 52
Morrow appeared in #2 of the new Metal Men miniseries, with his own group of robots, called the "Death Metal Men". He's later revealed to be an artificial intelligence living in an android replica of Morrow, while the Death Metal Men were atomic transmutations of the Metal Men themselves. Yet the real Morrow also has a hand in the series as Will Magnus' best teacher, who unsuccessfully attempted to have him accept a grant to research robots (Which would have benefited Morrow as well). He was later visited by a future version of Magnus, who gave him a ring for his past self to change the past. Morrow used his time traveling gear to aid Magnus, but then reveals he intends to kick him out of the timestream after defeating the monstrous Nameless. He is defeated and is erased from history.

On the cover of Justice League of America (vol. 2) #13, it shows him as a member of the latest incarnation of the Injustice League. As a member of Libra's Secret Society of Super Villains, he conceives of an idea on how to create a monster strong enough to kill a member of the Justice League. The team uses his idea to create the new villain Genocide. After it is created, he strongly tries to have the team destroy it due to Genocide's high level of instability. After his pleas are ignored and Wonder Woman destroys the Society's base Dr. Morrow offers to help the Amazon stop Genocide. He reveals that he is of Polish ancestry and wants no part in anything called genocide.

The New 52
In The New 52 (the 2011 reboot of the DC Comics universe), T. O. Morrow is reimaged as a S.T.A.R. Labs scientist works under Silas Stone and supervises Sarah Charles. Under orders from Silas Stone, Morrow saves the life of Victor Stone by turning him into Cyborg.

During the "Forever Evil" storyline, Dr. Thomas Morrow was seen at S.T.A.R. Labs' Detroit branch following the Crime Syndicate's invasion. Dr. Silas Stone and Dr. Thomas Morrow have been working hard since the power went out. They know that the Red Room (S.T.A.R. Labs' high-security vault which contains the most advanced technology in the world) and they need to protect it from the Crime Syndicate who they are sure are going to strike. They have built an energy weapon. When explosions strike the door, Dr. Thomas Morrow and Dr. Silas Stone are prepared to fire only for them to see Batman, Catwoman, and a critically injured Cyborg. When the scientists ask where the rest of the Justice League is. Batman merely states that "they didn't make it".

Powers and abilities
T. O. Morrow is a criminal mastermind and a scientific genius. He has also created technology that allows him to see into the future.

Other versions

Smallville
T. O. Morrow is featured in the Smallville Season 11 digital comic based on the TV series as a member of Emil Hamilton's Star Labs.

Flashpoint
In the alternate timeline of the Flashpoint event, Doctor Morrow created the Red Tornadoes to defend the Republic of Japan from the Amazon/Atlantean war. After his death, the Red Tornadoes are actively operating and unaware of his death. Traci Thirteen gets the Hermit tarot card and teleports to Tokyo, where she meets one of the Red Tornadoes. She tells him she is looking for a hermit and he lists the definitions. He says he will help her when he is finished, but he needs Dr. Morrow for this, whom he believes is asleep. Traci says he will not be waking up, which the Red Tornado does not understand. Traci teleports away.

In other media

Television
 T.O. Morrow appears in Young Justice, voiced by Jeff Bennett. This version is an elderly scientist assisted by Bromwell Stikk and a member of the Light who previously built Red Inferno, Red Torpedo, and Red Tornado in failed attempts to infiltrate and destroy the Justice Society of America and Justice League in his younger years, with Red Tornado going on to join the latter. In the present, Morrow employs an android double of his younger self in several failed attempts to capture and reprogram Red Tornado and destroy the League.
 T.O. Morrow appears in the Supergirl episode "Red Faced", portrayed by Iddo Goldberg, who also portrays Red Tornado. This version built Red Tornado to kill Kryptonians on General Sam Lane's orders. After Supergirl destroys the android however, Morrow is fired. He attempts to seek revenge on Lane, but is thwarted by Supergirl and killed by Alex Danvers.

Film
 T. O. Morrow appears in Justice League: War, voiced by Ioan Gruffudd. This version played a role in helping Silas Stone turn the latter's son Victor into Cyborg.
 An alternate universe version of Thomas Morrow appears in Justice League: Gods and Monsters. This version is a member of Lex Luthor's "Project Fair Play", a weapons program meant to destroy their universe's Justice League if necessary. After three of their number are killed, most of the remaining scientists regroup at Karen Beecher's house, but are killed by the Metal Men.

Video games
T. O. Morrow appears in DC Universe Online, voiced by Jens Anderson.

References

External links
 DCU Guide: T.O. Morrow

DC Comics supervillains
Fictional Polish-American people
Comics characters introduced in 1964
Characters created by Carmine Infantino
Characters created by Gardner Fox
DC Comics scientists